Bill Welychka is a Canadian television personality, best known as a VJ for MuchMusic and its sister station MuchMoreMusic from 1992 to 2005.

Born and raised in Welland, Ontario, Welychka first joined CHUM Limited in 1988 as a video editor for MuchMusic before transitioning to an on-air role as host of the channel's country music series Outlaws & Heroes in the early 1990s. In 1995, he became host of the world music show ClipTrip, as well as taking on regular duties as a general videoflow host. He stayed with Much for five more years until moving to MuchMoreMusic in 2000.

In 2005, Welychka moved to CKEM in Edmonton to take on hosting duties with Breakfast Television when the station was rebranded as Citytv.

In September 2006, Welyckha moved to A-Channel in Ottawa, as the new weather anchor, remaining in this role until 2011. The following year he joined CKWS-TV in Kingston, where he remains as of 2023. He also writes a column for the city's Kingston Whig-Standard, and is a contributor to CKWS's sister radio station CFMK-FM.

References

Canadian television meteorologists
Much (TV channel) personalities
Canadian people of Ukrainian descent
People from Welland
Seneca College alumni
Living people
Year of birth missing (living people)
Canadian VJs (media personalities)